The Lake Ontario Shore Railroad (LOSRR) was a short-lived common carrier railroad in New York that was absorbed by the Rome, Watertown and Ogdensburg Railroad.

Construction 
The LOSRR was chartered to be built from Suspension Bridge, New York to Oswego, New York in 1858.  The Lake Ontario Shore Railroad Company was founded in Oswego on March 27, 1868. Under Chief Engineer James Ross, work commenced in August 1871 in Red Creek, New York.  Tracks were open to Oswego, New York in 1873.

Early Death 
Despite heavy support from on-line and planned on-line communities, the LOSRR was unable to handle its great financial obligations.  Reasons include a lack of manufacturing industries, bypassing Rochester, New York and close competition with the New York Central Railroad.  Construction only got as far as Kendall, New York.  On September 22, 1874, the railroad was sold in court under foreclosure to the Rome, Watertown and Ogdensburg Railroad, who reorganized the railroad as the Lake Ontario Railroad Company on September 29.  On October 22, this company and the RW&O made an agreement to consolidate, which was filed with the New York Secretary of State on December 23, 1875.

See also 
List of defunct New York railroads

References 
Hojack History
Rome Watertown and Ogdensburg Railroad

Defunct New York (state) railroads
Predecessors of the New York Central Railroad
Railway companies established in 1868
Railway companies disestablished in 1874